Hiramoto (written: 平本) is a Japanese surname. Notable people with the surname include:

, Japanese manga artist
, Japanese footballer
, Japanese footballer

Japanese-language surnames